Charles "Chip" Beall (born 17 March 1954) is an American television host. Beall has hosted several student quiz shows including Texaco Star National Academic Championship, which was broadcast on the Discovery Channel, and Whiz Quiz. He is the president of Questions Unlimited, a company that writes questions for quiz bowl competitions. Their flagship event is the National Academic Championship.

References

American game show hosts
Living people
Place of birth missing (living people)
1954 births
People from Dallas
Television personalities from Arkansas